San Emilio, officially the Municipality of San Emilio, is a 4th class municipality in the province of Ilocos Sur, Philippines. According to the 2020 census, it has a population of 7,206 people.

Geography

Barangays
San Emilio is politically subdivided into 8 barangays. These barangays are headed by elected officials: Barangay Captain, Barangay Council, whose members are called Barangay Councilors. All are elected every three years.

 Cabaroan (Poblacion)
 Kalumsing
 Lancuas
 Matibuey
 Paltoc
 San Miliano
 Sibsibbu
 Tiagan

Climate

Demographics

In the 2020 census, San Emilio had a population of 7,206.

Economy

Government
San Emilio, belonging to the second congressional district of the province of Ilocos Sur, is governed by a mayor designated as its local chief executive and by a municipal council as its legislative body in accordance with the Local Government Code. The mayor, vice mayor, and the councilors are elected directly by the people through an election which is being held every three years.

Elected officials

References

External links
Pasyalang Ilocos Sur
Philippine Standard Geographic Code
Philippine Census Information
Local Governance Performance Management System

Municipalities of Ilocos Sur
Populated places on the Abra River